Amphicyclotulus perplexus is a species of tropical land snail with a gill and an operculum, a terrestrial gastropod mollusk in the family Neocyclotidae.

This land snail species is vulnerable to the possibility of extinction.

Distribution
This species is endemic to the island of Guadeloupe, West Indies.

References

Neocyclotidae
Taxonomy articles created by Polbot